Sagar Trivedi (born 20 October 1991) is an Indian cricketer who plays for Puducherry. He made his List A debut on 10 December 2015 in the 2015–16 Vijay Hazare Trophy. He made his first-class debut on 17 December 2019, for Puducherry in the 2019–20 Ranji Trophy.

References

External links
 

1991 births
Living people
Indian cricketers
Mumbai cricketers
Pondicherry cricketers
Cricketers from Mumbai